François Groleau (born January 23, 1973) is a Canadian former professional ice hockey defenceman who played eight games in the National Hockey League for the Montreal Canadiens over three seasons between 1996 and 1997. The rest of his career, which lasted from 1993 to 2013, was mainly spent in the minor leagues and then in the Deutsche Eishockey Liga.

Playing career
As a youth, Groleau played in the 1985 and 1986 Quebec International Pee-Wee Hockey Tournaments with a minor ice hockey team from Rive-Sud.

Groleau was drafted 41st overall by the Calgary Flames in the 1991 NHL Entry Draft.  He spent two seasons in the American Hockey League with the Saint John Flames before he was traded to the Quebec Nordiques in March 1995 for Ed Ward.  He finished the 1994–95 season in the AHL with the Cornwall Aces.

He signed with the Montreal Canadiens in July 1995 and played eight NHL games for the team over three seasons, scoring one assist.  He spent most of his tenure in the AHL with the Fredericton Canadiens and also spent a season in the International Hockey League with the San Francisco Spiders.

With his NHL career now at an end, Groleau moved to Germany in 1998, playing one season in the Deutsche Eishockey Liga for the Augsburger Panther.  He then returned to the AHL with the Quebec Citadelles again for one season.  In 2000, Groleau returned to the DEL, signing for Adler Mannheim.  He spent five seasons with the team, winning the league title in 2001 and the German Cup in 2003.  He signed for the Füchse Duisburg in 2005, but the team finished bottom of the league.  He signed for EHC Black Wings Linz in 2006.  After his second season with the Black Wings, Groleau spent two years in France with Diables Rouges de Briançon before returning to Canada to play with Thetford Mines Isothermic in 2010–11.

Career statistics

Regular season and playoffs

References

External links
 

1973 births
Living people
Adler Mannheim players
Augsburger Panther players
Calgary Flames draft picks
Canadian expatriate ice hockey players in Austria
Canadian expatriate ice hockey players in France
Canadian expatriate ice hockey players in Germany
Canadian ice hockey defencemen
Cornwall Aces players
Diables Rouges de Briançon players
EHC Black Wings Linz players
Füchse Duisburg players
Fredericton Canadiens players
Ice hockey people from Quebec
Montreal Canadiens players
Quebec Citadelles players
Saint-Jean Lynx players
Saint John Flames players
San Francisco Spiders players
Shawinigan Cataractes players
Sportspeople from Longueuil